Barjac is a commune in the Ariège department, Occitania, southwestern France.

The inhabitants of the commune are known as Barjacois or Barjacoises  .

Geography
Barjac is located in the old Volvestre region of Languedoc some 10 km north of Saint-Girons and 60 km south by south-west of Toulouse. Access to the commune is by route D303A which branches off the D3 west of the commune and passes through the commune east then south to join the D303 to La Crouzette south-east of the commune. It is a part of the Natural Regional Park of Pyrénées ariégeoises. The commune is mixed forest and farmland.

The Grande Goutte stream forms the western border of the commune as it flows north to join Le Lens river north of the commune. Le Macaoude stream similarly forms the eastern border as it flows north to join Le Lens just north of the commune.

History
Barzac appears as Barzac on the 1750 Cassini Map and the same on the 1790 version.

Demography
In 2017 the commune had 42 inhabitants.

See also
Communes of the Ariège department

References

Communes of Ariège (department)